Ștefan Vodă is a district in the south-east of Moldova, with the administrative center at Ștefan Vodă.
As of 1 January 2011, its population was 71,900. The district is situated 100 km from Chișinău and 100 km from Odessa, Ukraine.

History
Localities with the earliest documentary attestation are: Cioburciu, Olănești, Carahasani, first certified locations in 1405-1456. In the 16th-18th centuries, intense agriculture was developed, with important wine-making industries and population growth attested. In 1812, after the Russo-Turkish War (1806-1812), Bessarabia was incorporated into the Russian Empire during this period (1812–1917), and an intense russification of the native population occurred. In 1918, after the collapse of the Russian Empire, Bessarabia united with Romania (1918–1940, 1941–1944), and the district was part of the Cetatea Albă County. In 1940, after Molotov–Ribbentrop Pact, Bessarabia was occupied by the Soviet Union. In 1991 as a result of the proclamation of Independence of Moldova, the district became part and residence of the Tighina County (1991–2003), and in 2003 it became an administrative unit of Moldova.

Geography

Ștefan Vodă district is located in south-eastern part of the Republic of Moldova. It is bordered by Căușeni District in the northwest, Slobozia District in the northeast, and the state border with Ukraine in the south and east. The landscape is predominantly plain, slightly fractured, the highest altitude around 210–230 m in the western part of district. Minimum altitude 2–5 m in the Lower Nistru Plain. Erosion processes with a low intensity.

Climate
Temperate continental climate with an annual average district temperature +10.5+11 c. July average temperature +22+23 C, of January -4 C. Annual precipitation 450–550 mm. Average wind speed 3–5 m \ s.

Fauna
Typical European fauna, with the presence of such mammals such as foxes, hedgehogs, deer, wild boar, polecat, wild cat, ermine and others. Of birds: partridges, crows, eagles, starling, swallow and more.

Flora
Forests of the district are complemented by tree species such as oak, ash, hornbeam, linden, maple, walnut and others. From plants: wormwood, knotweed, fescue, nettle and many others.

Rivers
Ștefan Vodă district is located in the basin of the Nistru River, which crosses the district in the north-eastern part of district. Tributaries of the Nistru here are usually short. The area has numerous artificial lakes.

Administrative subdivisions
Localities: 26
Administrative center: Ștefan Vodă
Cities: Ștefan Vodă
Villages: 3
Communes: 22

Demographics
1 January 2012 the district population was 71,500 of which 12.1% urban and 87.9% rural population
Births (2010): 832 (11.5 per 1000)
Deaths (2010): 950 (13.2 per 1000)
Growth rate (2010): -118 (-1.6 per 1000)

Ethnic groups 

Footnote: * There is an ongoing controversy regarding the ethnic identification of Moldovans and Romanians.

Religion 
Christians - 97.8%
Orthodox Christians - 94.3%
Protestant - 3.5%
Baptists - 3.0%
Seventh-day Adventists - 0.3%
Evangelicals - 0.1%
Pentecostals - 0.1%
Other 1.2%
No religion 1.0%

Economy

Ștefan Vodă District hosts a total of 14,469 registered businesses, many of which are agricultural.  Agricultural land makes up 65,199 ha (65.3%) of total land area, while arable land occupies 55,542 ha (55.6%) of the total agricultural land. The farmland in the district includes 4977 ha (5.0%) of vines, 3237 ha (3.2%) of orchards, and 1398 ha (1.4%) of pastures. Major crops grown in the area include wheat, oats, sunflower, canola, soybeans, and vegetables.

Education
Stefan Voda district are 63 educational institutions, including 31 kindergartens, 30 primary and secondary education, a vocational school. In schools with training and education are included in total 13,673 students, including 2,839 children in kindergartens in schools, 10,284 university students, 354 students in vocational schools, 196 vocational school students. Nowadays in education, the 1264 district teachers operate.

Politics
Stefan Voda district granted priority mainly right-wing parties. In Moldova represented by the AEI. PCRM is a continuous fall in percentage the last three elections.

During the last three elections AEI had an increase of 107.6%

Elections

|-
!style="background-color:#E9E9E9" align=center colspan=2 valign=center|Parties and coalitions
!style="background-color:#E9E9E9" align=right|Votes
!style="background-color:#E9E9E9" align=right|%
!style="background-color:#E9E9E9" align=right|+/−
|-
| 
|align=left|Liberal Democratic Party of Moldova
|align="right"|11,759
|align="right"|38.76
|align="right"|+17.07
|-
| 
|align=left|Party of Communists of the Republic of Moldova
|align="right"|9,998
|align="right"|32.96
|align="right"|−3.56
|-
| 
|align=left|Democratic Party of Moldova
|align="right"|3,497
|align="right"|11,53
|align="right"|+2.84
|-
| 
|align=left|Liberal Party
|align="right"|2,263
|align="right"|7.46
|align="right"|−6.85
|-
| 
|align=left|Party Alliance Our Moldova
|align="right"|792
|align="right"|2.61
|align="right"|−5.43
|-
|bgcolor="grey"|
|align=left|United Moldova 
|align="right"|391
|align="right"|1.29
|align="right"|+1.29
|-
|bgcolor="grey"|
|align=left|Humanist Party of Moldova 
|align="right"|324
|align="right"|1.07
|align="right"|+1.07
|-
|bgcolor="grey"|
|align=left|Other Party
|align="right"|1,323
|align="right"|4.32
|align="right"|-6.43
|-
|align=left style="background-color:#E9E9E9" colspan=2|Total (turnout 56.29%)
|width="30" align="right" style="background-color:#E9E9E9"|30,628
|width="30" align="right" style="background-color:#E9E9E9"|100.00
|width="30" align="right" style="background-color:#E9E9E9"|

Culture
In district active: 26 culture houses, 2 museums, 86 artistic bands including 26 bands holding the title of the band model, 37 public libraries.

Education
In Stefan Voda district works: a hospital with 220 beds general fund, a center of family doctor's in the composition of which included: 13 health center's, nine family doctors office.
The population of the district health care operates 110 medical personnel 354 average, 260 nurses and auxiliary health personnel.

References

 Descrierea generală a raionului Ştefan Vodă
 Discuție:Raionul Ștefan Vodă
 District population per year
 Rezultatele alegerilor din 28 noiembrie 2010 în raionul Ştefan Vodă

 
Districts of Moldova